Ocellarnaca is a genus of Orthopterans, sometimes known as 'leaf-folding crickets' in the subfamily Gryllacridinae, tribe Gryllacridini and the genus group Gryllacrae Blanchard, 1845.  The recorded distribution is currently: China including Hainan and Vietnam.

Species 
The Orthoptera Species File lists:
 Ocellarnaca angulata Gorochov, 2004
 Ocellarnaca brachyptera Shi & Zhu, 2021
 Ocellarnaca braueri (Griffini, 1911)
 Ocellarnaca brevicauda Li, Fang, Liu & Li, 2014
 Ocellarnaca conica Bian, Shi & Guo, 2013
 Ocellarnaca coomani Li, Fang, Liu & Li, 2014
 Ocellarnaca disjuncta Ingrisch, 2018
 Ocellarnaca emeiensis Li, Fang, Liu & Li, 2014
 Ocellarnaca fallax (Liu, 1999)
 Ocellarnaca furcifera (Karny, 1926)
 Ocellarnaca fusca Ingrisch, 2018
 Ocellarnaca fuscotessellata (Karny, 1926)
 Ocellarnaca longilobulata Lu, Zhang & Bian, 2022
 Ocellarnaca nigra Shi & Zhu, 2021
 Ocellarnaca ocellata Gorochov, 2004 - type species (locality: near Buon Luoi village, Gia Lai Province, Vietnam) 
 Ocellarnaca wolffii (Krausze, 1906)
 Ocellarnaca xiai Li, Fang, Liu & Li, 2014

References

External links
Image at iNaturalist.org

Ensifera genera
Gryllacrididae
Orthoptera of Indo-China